Norwich Township may refer to the following places:

Canada
Norwich Township, Ontario

United States

Norwich Township, Missaukee County, Michigan
Norwich Township, Newaygo County, Michigan
Norwich Township, McHenry County, North Dakota
Norwich Township, Franklin County, Ohio
Norwich Township, Huron County, Ohio
Norwich Township, McKean County, Pennsylvania

Township name disambiguation pages